Niar (also Romanized as Nīār and Niyar) is a village in Sharqi Rural District, in the Central District of Ardabil County, Ardabil Province, Iran. At the 2016 census, its population was 18,405, in 2,218 families.

References 

Towns and villages in Ardabil County